Saprosma fragrans is a species of plant in the family Rubiaceae. It is endemic to the region of Assam.

References

Flora of Assam (region)
fragrans
Vulnerable plants
Taxonomy articles created by Polbot